The University of Music and Theatre "Felix Mendelssohn Bartholdy" Leipzig is a public university in Leipzig (Saxony, Germany). Founded in 1843 by Felix Mendelssohn as the Conservatorium der Musik (Conservatory of Music), it is the oldest university school of music in Germany.

The institution includes the traditional Church Music Institute founded in 1919 by Karl Straube (1873–1950). The music school was renamed ″Felix Mendelssohn Bartholdy″ after its founder in 1972. In 1992, it incorporated the Theaterhochschule "Hans Otto" Leipzig.
 
Since the beginning there was a tight relationship between apprenticeship and practical experience with the Gewandhaus and the Oper Leipzig, as well as theaters in Chemnitz (Theater Chemnitz), Dresden (Staatsschauspiel Dresden), Halle (Neues Theater Halle), Leipzig (Schauspiel Leipzig) and Weimar (Deutsches Nationaltheater in Weimar).

The university of music and theater is one of 365 places chosen in 2009 by the Cabinet of Germany and the Office of the Representative of German Industry and Trade for the campaign Germany – Land of Ideas.

History
Felix Mendelssohn Bartholdy, the composer and Music Director of the Gewandhaus Orchestra, founded a Conservatory in the city of Leipzig on 2 April 1843. It was financed by a senior civil servant of the Kingdom of Saxony, the Oberhofgerichtsrat Heinrich Blümner (1765–1839), who provided King Frederick Augustus II of Saxony with 20,000 Thaler.

The music school's home was in the first Gewandhaus (in the Gewandgäßchen/Universitätsstraße street at the city center, today the city's department store is based there). The musicians of the Orchestra were obligated to act as teaching staff, a tradition that was unbroken until German reunification in 1990.

In 1876 the school got permission to change its name to Königliches Konservatorium der Musik zu Leipzig, Royal Conservatory of Music of Leipzig. The new premises at Grassistraße 8 were inaugurated on 5 December 1887. They were built 1885–1887 by the architect Hugo Licht in the music quarter of Leipzig, south-west of the city center. The benefactor was the pathologist Justus Radius.

Not until 1924 was the Royal Conservatory renamed into Landeskonservatorium der Musik zu Leipzig, six years after the fall of the Kingdom of Saxony.

In the summer term of 1938, 343 male students were enrolled at the Landeskonservatorium. This made the Conservatory the fourth biggest music school in the German Reich after the Universität der Künste Berlin (633 students), the music school of Cologne (406 students) and the school for music and theater of Munich (404 students).

The Austrian composer Johann Nepomuk David (1895–1977) was the school's director from 1939 until 1945.

The school was again renamed 8 June 1941 to Staatliche Hochschule für Musik, Musikerziehung und darstellende Kunst, Public College for music, musical education and performing arts. In 1944 the school remained closed due to the Second World War.

Once again, the school was renamed 1 October 1946 to Mendelssohn Academy and 4 November 1972, on the occasion of its founders name, to Hochschule für Musik Felix Mendelssohn Bartholdy, Felix Mendelssohn Bartholdy College of Music.

The Saxon University Constitution Law (Sächsische Hochschulstrukturgesetz) of 10 April 1992 confirmed the College of Music to Leipzig and expanded it with the annexation of the Hans Otto College of Theatre (Germany's first College of Theatre) to form the Hochschule für Musik und Theater Felix Mendelssohn Bartholdy : the Felix Mendelssohn Bartholdy College of Music and Theatre.

The new Great Hall was inaugurated 2001 and 2004 awarded by the Bund Deutscher Architekten, a German architects union. The college's second premises were opened 2002 and there's an orchestra academy in co-operation with the Gewandhausorchestra since 2004 in order to support top musicians.

Names
 1843–1876: Conservatorium der Musik
 1876–1924: Königliches Konservatorium der Musik zu Leipzig
 1924–1941: Landeskonservatorium der Musik zu Leipzig
 1941–1944: Staatliche Hochschule für Musik, Musikerziehung und darstellende Kunst
 1946–1972: Staatliche Hochschule für Musik – Mendelssohn-Akademie
 1972–1992: Hochschule für Musik "Felix Mendelssohn Bartholdy"
 1992–: Hochschule für Musik und Theater "Felix Mendelssohn Bartholdy" Leipzig

Notable people

Notable alumni

This is an assortment of notable alumni: (See also :Category:University of Music and Theatre Leipzig alumni)
 Emil Büchner (1826–1908), German conductor and bandmaster
 Friedrich Baumfelder (1836–1916), German conductor, composer, and pianist
 Jakob Grün (1837–1916), Austrian violinist
 Sir Arthur Sullivan (1842–1900), English composer
 Mykola Lysenko (1842–1912), Ukrainian composer, pianist and music educator
 Edvard Grieg (1843–1907), Norwegian composer
 Hugo Riemann (1849–1919), German music theorist, music historian, music educator and music lexicographer
 Émile Sauret (1852–1920), French violin virtuoso and composer.
 Johannes Helstone (1853–1927), Surinamese composer, pianist and writer.
 George Whitefield Chadwick (1854–1931), American composer, of the 'Second New England School'
 Leoš Janáček (1854–1928), Czech composer
 Paul Klengel (1854–1935), German violinist, pianist, composer
 Fritz Steinbach (1855–1916), German conductor
 Richard Sahla (1855–1931) Austrian violin virtuoso, conductor and composer 
 Christian Sinding (1856–1941), Norwegian composer
 Ethel Smyth (1858–1944), English composer
Bertha Tapper (1859–1915), Norwegian pianist and editor 
 Isaac Albéniz (1860–1909), Spanish composer and pianist
 Joseph Hirschbach (1860–1897), Musical Director, Tivoli Opera House, San Francisco
 Frederick Delius (1862–1934), English composer
 Ferruccio Busoni (1866–1924), Italian pianist and composer
 Leota Henson (1866-1955), American piano accompanist for the Fisk Jubilee Singers
 Felix von Weingartner (1863–1942), Austrian conductor, composer, pianist and writer
Anna Diller Starbuck (1868-1929) composer and pianist
 Alfred Hill (1869–1960), Australian composer, conductor and teacher
 Mikalojus Konstantinas Čiurlionis (1875-1911), Lithuanian composer and painter
 Sigfrid Karg-Elert (1877–1933), German composer
 Gertrude Förstel (1880–1950), studied piano, but was remembered as soprano
 Carl Adolf Martienssen (1881–1955), German pianist and music educator
 Wilhelm Backhaus (1884–1969), German pianist
 Leo Funtek (1885–1965), violinist, conductor, arranger and music professor
 Hermann Keller (1885–1967), German church musician und musicologist
 Rudolf Mauersberger (1889–1971), German choir director und composer, cantor of the Dresdner Kreuzchor
 Sir Adrian Boult (1889–1983), English conductor
 Erwin Schulhoff (1894–1942), Czech composer and pianist
 Johannes Weyrauch (1897–1977), German composer
 Günther Ramin (1898–1956), German organist, choir director and composer
 Wilhelm Weismann (1900–1980) German composer and musicologist
 Franz Konwitschny (1901–1962), German conductor
 Erhard Mauersberger (1903–1982), German organist, music teacher, cantor of the Thomanerchor
 Kurt Thomas (1904–1973), German composer and choir director
 Hugo Distler (1907–1942), German composer and church musician
 Wolfgang Fortner (1907–1987), German composer, composition teacher and conductor
 Helmut Walcha (1907–1991), German organist and harpsichordist
 Miklós Rózsa (1907–1995), Hungarian American Hollywood film composer
 Anne Macnaghten (1908–2000), British violinist and pedagogue
 Herman Berlinski (1910–2001), German-born American composer, organist, pianist, musicologist and choir conductor
 Sina Berlinski née Goldfein (1910–2011), German-born American pianist and piano teacher
 Robert Köbler (1912–1970), German university organist
 Martin Flämig (1913–1998), German choir director, Protestant state-church music director, cantor of the Dresdner Kreuzchor
 Heinz Wunderlich (1919–2012), German organist, academic and composer
 Amadeus Webersinke (1920–2005), German pianist and organist
 Karl Richter (1926–1981) German choir director, conductor, harpsichordist, organist
 Klaus Tennstedt (1926–1998), German conductor
 Ruth Zechlin (1926–2007), German composer, organist
 Götz Friedrich (1930–2000), German director
 Gerhard Bosse (1922–2012), German violinist and conductor
 Kurt Masur (1927–2015), German conductor
 Karl-Heinz Kämmerling (1930–2012), German piano teacher
 Hans-Joachim Schulze (born 1934), German Bach scholar 
 Siegfried Thiele (born 1934), German composer
 Harry Kupfer (1935–2019), German impresario
 Annerose Schmidt (1936–2022), German pianist
 Peter Sodann (born 1936), German actor
 Christoph Schroth (born 1937), German director
 Peter Herrmann (1941–2015), German composer
 Ludwig Güttler (born 1943), German trumpeter
 Rosemarie Lang, German singer
 Jürnjakob Timm (born 1949), German cellist
 Freya Klier (born 1950) German author, director
 Ulrich Mühe (1953–2007), German actor
 Georg Christoph Biller (1955–2022), Thomaskantor
 Ulrich Böhme (born 1956), German organist
 Matthias Eisenberg (born 1956), German organist
 Tom Pauls (born 1959), German actor and cabaret artist
 Steffen Schleiermacher (born 1960), German composer and pianist
 Michael Schönheit (born 1961), German organist and conductor
 Irina Pauls (born 1961), German choreographer
 Tobias Künzel (born 1964), German pop singer
 Simone Kermes (born 1965), operatic soprano
 Frank-Michael Erben (born 1965), German violinist
 Ralf Stabel (born 1965), German theatre scholar / dance scholar
 Sebastian Krumbiegel (born 1966), German pop singer
 Matthias Goerne (born 1967), German singer
 David Timm (born 1969), German pianist, organist, choral conductor and jazz musician
 Nadja Uhl (born 1972), German actress
 Christel Loetzsch (born 1986), German mezzo-soprano
 Louise Collier Willcox (1865–1929), American author, editor, anthologist, translator, suffragist
 [Soo Jung Kwon]] (born 1979), Pianist, educator, musician

Notable faculty

 Adolph Brodsky (1851–1929), Russian violinist, later Principal of the Royal Manchester College of Music
 Ferdinand David (1810–1873), German violin virtuoso and composer
 Johann Nepomuk David (1895–1977), Austrian composer
 Karl Davydov (1838–1889), Russian cellist
 Niels Gade (1817–1890), Danish composer
 Friedrich Grützmacher (1832–1903), German cellist
 Moritz Hauptmann (1792–1868), German composer and writer; Thomaskantor
 Diethard Hellmann (1928–1999), German organist and choral conductor
 Peter Herrmann (1941–2015), German composer
 Salomon Jadassohn (1831–1902), German composer
 Sigfrid Karg-Elert (1877–1933), German composer
 Julius Klengel (1859–1933), German cellist
 Paul Klengel (1854–1935), German violinist, pianist, composer
 Kolja Lessing (born 1961), German violinist, pianist, composer and academic teacher
 Fabien Lévy (1968– ), Composer
 Kurt Masur (1927–2015), German conductor
 Felix Mendelssohn Bartholdy (1809–1847), German composer, pianist and Music Director of the Leipzig Gewandhaus Orchestra; Founder
 Ignaz Moscheles (1794–1870), Bohemian composer and piano virtuoso
 Oscar Paul (1836–1898), German musicologist and writer
 Günther Ramin (1898–1956), German composer, organist, cembalist, conductor, Thomaskantor
 Max Reger (1873–1917), German composer, conductor, pianist and organist
 Carl Reinecke (1824–1910), Danish composer, conductor, and pianist
 Julius Rietz (1812–1877), German cellist, composer and conductor
 Ernst Friedrich Richter, German music theorist; Thomaskantor
 Wilhelm Rust, German musicologist and composer; Thomaskantor
 Richard Sahla (1855–1931)  Austrian violin virtuoso, conductor and composer 
 Friedrich Schneider (1786–1853), German composer and conductor
 Gustav Schreck, German music educator and composer; Thomaskantor
 Clara Schumann (1819–1896), German pianist, teacher, and composer
 Robert Schumann (1810–1856), German composer, aesthete and influential music critic
 Hans Sitt (1850–1922), German violinist and composer
 Karl Straube, German Organist and choral conductor; Thomaskantor
 Wolfgang Unger (1948–2004), choral conductor, director of Leipziger Universitätsmusik

Institute of Church Music
The Institute of Church Music (Kirchenmusikalische Institut) was refounded 1992. The institute has a prominent role in Germany because of Max Reger (1873–1916), Kurt Thomas (1904–1973) and Günther Ramin (1898–1956). It offers programs in church music, chorus conduction and organ. It offers research masters in those subjects as well.

The Institute of Church Music was founded by Karl Straube (1873–1950) in 1921 and 1926 it became part of the Saxon Evangelical-Lutheran Church.

Administration

Rectors of the university:
 1843–1847: Felix Mendelssohn (1809–1847)
 1849–1881: Heinrich Conrad Schleinitz (1805–1881)
 1881–1897: Otto Günther (1822–1897)
 1897–1902: Carl Reinecke (1824–1910)
 1902–1907: Arthur Nikisch (1855–1922)
 1907–1924: Stephan Krehl (1864–1924)
 1924–1932: Max Pauer (1866–1945)
 1932–1942: Walther Davisson (1885–1973)
 1942–1945: Johann Nepomuk David (1895–1977)
 1945–1948: Heinrich Schachtebeck (1886–1965)
 1948–1973: Rudolf Fischer (1913–2003)
 1973–1984: Gustav Schmahl (1929–2003)
 1984–1987: Peter Herrmann (1941–2015)
 1987–1990: Werner Felix (1927–1998)
 1990–1997: Siegfried Thiele (born 1934)
 1997–2003: Christoph Krummacher (born 1949)
 2003–2006: Konrad Körner (born 1941)
 2006–2015: Robert Ehrlich (born 1965)
 2015–2020: Martin Kürschner (born 1954)
 2020– : Gerald Fauth (born 1959)

Departments

Bologna process
Since 1999 the school is adapting to the Bologna process. As of 2008 the adjustment to the Bachelor's degree and Master's degree system is being organized. The education program with major in school music is since the winter term of 2006/07 already adapted to the Bologna process and as such leads to a bachelor's degree. The programs of the Institute of Church Music were changed to the beginning of the winter term 2008/09 and until the winter term of 2010/2011 all programs have to be adapted to the Bologna process.

Orchestra
The school has its own symphony orchestra under the conduction of Ulrich Windfuhr until 2013 and Matthias Foremny since 2014.

Departments

 Faculty I
 Wind instruments and percussion instruments
 Conducting and correpetition
 Singing and musical theatre (e.g. opera)
 String instruments and harp
 Faculty II
 Early music
 Piano
 Musical composition and music texture
 Musicology, music education and languages
 School music education
 Church Music Institute
 Faculty III
 Dramaturgy
 Jazz, pop music and musical theater ("musical")
 Acting

Students
A total of 813 students were enrolled at the college in 2007 (375 males and 438 females). There were 260 (32%) international students enrolled at the time. They come above all from Poland, Russia, South Korea and China. Thirteen of them are scholarship holders of the German Academic Exchange Service, this makes the school the best one on the scholarship holders list out of every German Music Colleges.

Contests
The Felix Mendelssohn College of Music and Theatre organizes many music contests. The Lions-Club Leipzig hosts the Albert-Lortzing-Förderpreis Singing Contest with a €2,500 prize. Furthermore, the college organizes a contest for ensembles and the recognized Young Concert Artists European Auditions together with the Young Concert Artists (YCA), New York.
The school leads among all German colleges of music with a total of 470 public events yearly.

See also
Music schools in Germany

Further reading

In German
 Whistling, Karl W.: Statistik des Königl. Conservatoriums der Musik zu Leipzig 1843–1883. Aus Anlass des vierzigjährigen Jubiläums der Anstalt. Breitkopf & Härtel. Leipzig 1883.
 Das neue Königliche Konservatorium der Musik in Leipzig. Erbaut von Baurath Hugo Licht daselbst. Architektonische Rundschau. Leipzig 1886.
 Vogel, C. B.: Das Königliche Conservatorium der Musik zu Leipzig. Felix Schloemp. Leipzig 1888.
 Das Königliche Konservatorium der Musik zu Leipzig. 1843–1893. Königliches Konservatorium der Musik. Leipzig 1893.
 Königliches Konservatorium der Musik Leipzig: Festschrift zum 75-jährigen Bestehen des Königl. Konservatoriums der Musik zu Leipzig. Am 2. April 1918. Siegel Verlag. Leipzig 1918.
 Das Königliche Konservatorium der Musik zu Leipzig. 1893–1918. Königliches Konservatorium der Musik. Leipzig 1918.
 Landeskonservatorium der Musik zu Leipzig. 85. Studienjahr 1928/29. Eigenverlag. Leipzig 1928.
 Seidel, Christine: Namhafte Musiker als Musikerzieher am Konservatorium der Musik zu Leipzig von der Entstehung am 2. April 1843 bis zur Jahrhundertwende. Staatsexamensarbeit. Leipzig 1953.
 Hochschule für Musik Leipzig. Gegründet 1843 als Conservatorium der Musik von Felix Mendelssohn-Bartholdy. Herausgegeben anlässlich der Festwoche vom 17. bis 24. April 1955. Leipzig 1955.
 Wehnert, Martin (Hrsg.): Hochschule für Musik Leipzig. Gegründet als Conservatorium der Musik. 1843–1968. Leipzig 1968.
 Forner, Johannes: Mendelssohns Mitstreiter am Leipziger Konservatorium. Verlag Neue Musik. Berlin 1972.
 Forner, Johannes: 150 Jahre Musikhochschule 1843–1993. Hochschule für Musik und Theater Felix Mendelssohn Bartholdy Leipzig. Festschrift. Verlag für Kunst und Touristik. Leipzig 1993. 
 Zandt, Herman S.J.: Der Einfluß des Dessauer Musikinstitutes und des Leipziger Konservatoriums auf die niederländische (protestantische) Orgelkunst. Landesverb. Hagen 1993.
 Rosenmüller, Annegret: Zur Geschichte des Kirchenmusikalischen Institutes von der Gründung bis zur Wiedereröffnung 1992. Materialsammlung anhand von Akten des Archivs der Hochschule für Musik und Theater "Felix Mendelssohn Bartholdy". Hochschule für Musik und Theater. Leipzig 1999.
 Goltz, Maren: Das Kirchenmusikalische Institut. Spuren einer wechselvollen Geschichte. Dokumentation der Ausstellung "Das Kirchenmusikalische Institut" im Rahmen der Wandelausstellung zum Bach-Jahr 2000 in Leipzig. Hochschule für Musik und Theater "Felix Mendelssohn Bartholdy". Leipzig 2001. 
 10 Jahre Fachrichtung Alte Musik. Festschrift. Rektor der Hochschule für Musik und Theater. Leipzig 2001.
 Reisaus, Joachim: Grieg und das Leipziger Konservatorium. Untersuchungen zur Persönlichkeit des norwegischen Komponisten Edvard Grieg unter besonderer Berücksichtigung seiner Leipziger Studienjahre. Eigenverlag. Norderstedt 2002. 
 Nedzelskis, Adelbertas: Der litauische Künstler M. K. Ciurlionis in Leipzig. Der Studienaufenthalt des Meisters am Königlichen Konservatorium 1901–1902. Ed. Bodoni. Berlin 2003.
 Goltz, Maren: Studien zur Geschichte der Bibliothek der Hochschule für Musik und Theater "Felix Mendelssohn Bartholdy" Leipzig von 1843 bis 1945 mit einem Ausblick bis zur Gegenwart. Hausarbeit. Berlin 2003.
 Krumbiegel, Martin: Hochschule für Musik und Theater "Felix Mendelssohn Bartholdy" Leipzig. Eigenverlag. Leipzig 2004.
 Jäger, Andrea: Die Entwicklung eines Bestandserhaltungskonzeptes für den historischen Sonderbestand der Bibliothek der Hochschule für Musik und Theater "Felix Mendelssohn Bartholdy" Leipzig. Diplomarbeit. Leipzig 2004.
 Wasserloos, Yvonne: Das Leipziger Konservatorium im 19. Jahrhundert. Anziehungs- und Ausstrahlungskraft eines musikpädagogischen Modells auf das internationale Musikleben. Georg Olms Verlag. Hildesheim 2004.

In English
 Phillips, Leonard Milton Jr.: The Leipzig Conservatory 1843–1881. UMI Dissertation Publishing. Ann Arbor, Michigan 2001.
 VanWart, Helen: Letters from Helen. Sybertooth. Sackville, New Brunswick 2010.

Notes

References

Sources

External links

  
 Leipzig-Encyclopedia 

 
Buildings and structures in Leipzig
Music schools in Germany
Drama schools in Germany
Public universities and colleges in Germany
Educational institutions established in 1843
Education in Leipzig
Felix Mendelssohn
1843 establishments in Germany
1843 establishments in Saxony